Jemima Shore is a fictional character created by Antonia Fraser, and is portrayed as TV's consummately professional investigative journalist. She is featured in a series of crime novels.

Novels 
 Quiet as a Nun (1977)
 The Wild Island (1978)
 A Splash of Red (1981)
 Cool Repentance (1982)
 Oxford Blood (1985)
 Jemima Shore's First Case, and Other Stories (1986; short story collection with 5 JS stories and 8 others)
 Your Royal Hostage (1987)
 The Cavalier Case (1990)
 Jemima Shore at the Sunny Grave (1991)
 Political Death (1995)

Television 
Fraser's creation has been the basis of two television series which were broadcast in the United Kingdom: the 1978 Armchair Thriller serial Quiet as a Nun with Maria Aitken as Jemima Shore, and an omnibus series, Jemima Shore Investigates, starring Patricia Hodge in the title role. The series was produced by Thames Television for the ITV network in 1983. One series of twelve episodes was made.

References

External links
 

Shore, Jemima
Characters in British novels of the 20th century
Fictional reporters
Jemima Shore
Jemima Shore Investigates
Jemima Shore Investigates
Jemima Shore Investigates
Jemima Shore Investigates